Rex M. Best is an American soap opera writer. He was a staff script writer on "The Young and the Restless" for fifteen years (1987-2002). He currently writes scripts for Y&R's sister soap, "The Bold and the Beautiful." He has won eight Emmys for Best Writing (three for Y&R and five for B&B) and a Writers Guild Award. He currently lives in Greensboro, North Carolina. Prior to his daytime writing career, he taught students with autism in the Greensboro school system.

Positions held
The Bold and the Beautiful
Script Writer (July 2003 - June 2005; October 12, 2005 - January 7, 2008; April 2008 – Present)
Script Editor (July 25, 2005 - September 8, 2005)

The Young and the Restless
Script Writer (September 1987 - July 2002) (15 years)

Awards and nominations
Daytime Emmy Awards 
WINS: (1992, 1997 & 2000: Best Writing, The Young And The Restless); 2010: Best Writing, The Bold and the Beautiful; 2012: Best Writing, The Bold and the Beautiful; 2015: Best Writing, The Bold and the Beautiful, 
NOMINATIONS: (2007: Best Writing, The Bold and the Beautiful; 2006: Best Writing, The Bold And The Beautiful); (1990-1991, 1993–1995, 1998–1999, 2001 & 2003; Best Writing; The Young And The Restless)

Writers Guild of America Award 
WIN: (2002 Season; The Young and The Restless)
NOMINATIONS: (1999 & 2001 Season; The Young and The Restless)

References

American soap opera writers
American male screenwriters
Year of birth missing (living people)
Living people
Daytime Emmy Award winners
American male television writers